Lucas Arnold and Mariano Hood were the defending champions, but lost in the semifinals this year.

František Čermák and Leoš Friedl won the title, defeating José Acasuso and Sebastián Prieto 6–2, 7–5 in the final.

Seeds

  Gastón Etlis /  Martín Rodríguez (first round)
  Lucas Arnold /  Mariano Hood (semifinals)
  František Čermák /  Leoš Friedl (champions)
  Mariusz Fyrstenberg /  Marcin Matkowski (quarterfinals)

Draw

Draw

References
Draw

ATP Buenos Aires
2005 ATP Tour
Copa
2005 ATP Buenos Aires